Zinc finger protein 217, also known as ZNF217, is a protein which in humans is encoded by the ZNF217 gene.

Function 

ZNF217 can attenuate apoptotic signals resulting from telomere dysfunction and may promote neoplastic transformation and later stages of malignancy.  Znf217 was shown to be a prognostic biomarker and therapeutic target during breast cancer progression.

See also 
 Zinc finger

References

Further reading

External links 
 

Transcription factors